Julio Rocha López (12 October 1950 – 13 January 2018) was a Nicaraguan football administrator, FIFA development officer, Central American Football Union (UNCAF) president, and Nicaraguan Football Federation (FENIFUT) president. Rocha López was arrested in May 2015 in Switzerland to face corruption charges in the United States.

Rocha López was banned by the FIFA Ethics Committee.

In December 2016, he pleaded guilty in federal court in Brooklyn, US, to charges of racketeering conspiracy and wire fraud conspiracy.

Rocha López died from a terminal illness in the US, on 13 January 2018.

References

1950 births
2018 deaths
FIFA officials
Football in Nicaragua
People from Carazo Department
Association footballers not categorized by position